Every Day Isn't Sunday (German: Alle Tage ist kein Sonntag) may refer to:

 Every Day Isn't Sunday, a song composed by Carl Clewing 
 Every Day Isn't Sunday (1935 film), a German film directed by Walter Janssen
 Every Day Isn't Sunday (1959 film), a West German film directed by  Helmut Weiss

de:Alle Tage ist kein Sonntag